Sergei Aleksandrovich Tomarov (born 25 May 1982) is a Russian football coach and a former player. He is a coach at the academy of FC Ufa.

Coaching career
On 13 June 2018, he signed a 3-year contract as the manager of FC Ufa. He resigned from Ufa with team in 15th place on 7 November 2018.

On 15 June 2022, Tomarov was appointed as a caretaker manager of Ufa.

References

External links
 Profile by Russian Football Premier League

1982 births
Living people
Russian footballers
Association football forwards
Russian football managers
FC Ufa managers
Russian Premier League managers
FC Neftyanik Ufa players